"Opus 17 (Don't You Worry 'bout Me)" is a song composed by Sandy Linzer and Denny Randell and recorded by The Four Seasons in 1966 for their album Working My Way Back to You.

Background
"Opus 17" was the first hit with new full-time bassist/bass vocalist Joe Long. The title meant that this was the 17th single released by the Four Seasons.

As was the case with another Linzer-Randell contribution to the Four Seasons catalog, "Let's Hang On!", "Opus 17" features a rhythmic vocal hook within each verse, but, unlike in most Four Seasons singles, falsetto singing is muted  except in the Coda section by Frankie Valli (songs without falsetto were usually released as Valli solo numbers in this era). The song begins in F-sharp major, and goes up by half scale, until it reaches the coda in B major.

Billboard praised the "excellent vocal and instrumental production."  Cash Box described the song as a "pulsating, blues-soaked romancer with an infectious, Seasons-associated repeating, danceable riff."

Chart history
The song was released as the official follow-up to "Working My Way Back to You" and reached the #13 position on the Billboard Hot 100 singles chart.

References

The Four Seasons (band) songs
1966 singles
Songs written by Sandy Linzer
Song recordings produced by Bob Crewe
Songs written by Denny Randell
Philips Records singles
1966 songs